Ernesto Sabbatini (8 September 1878 – 5 October 1954) was an Italian stage and film actor. Sabbatini emerged as a star in the Fascist era, appearing in films such as the drama Like the Leaves (1935).

Selected filmography
 Anna Karenine (1917)
 The Prince of the Impossible (1918)
 My Little One (1933)
 Like the Leaves (1935)
 Grattacieli (1943)
 A Little Wife (1943)
 Maria Malibran (1943)
 Hand of Death (1949)

References

Bibliography 
 Landy, Marcia. The Folklore of Consensus: Theatricality in the Italian Cinema, 1930-1943. SUNY Press, 1998.

External links 
 

1878 births
1954 deaths
Italian male film actors
Italian male stage actors
Actors from Padua
20th-century Italian male actors